Turkmenistan President’s Cup was an international football tournament in Turkmenistan which was created in 1995 and dissolved in 2013. The tournament was dedicated to Day of State Flag of Turkmenistan. The tournament prize money was US 35,000. The winner would receive US$20,000 together with President’s Cup, the silver-medal winner – US$10,000 and the bronze-medal winner – US$5,000.

The international football tournament traditionally held in Ashgabat is very popular in the region. Over its history, teams from Armenia, Belarus, Georgia, Kazakhstan, Kyrgyz Republic, Latvia, Lithuania, Moldova, Russia, Ukraine, Uzbekistan, Tajikistan, Estonia, Iran, Turkey, Republic of Korea, China, Thailand competed for Turkmenistan President’s Cup. In 2009, a team from Bahrain made a debut in the tournament in Ashgabat thus extending it geographically to 20 countries.

During 19 years President's Cup left the country three times – Iranian Esteghlal won the honorary trophy in 1998, Georgian Torpedo Kutaisi in 2002 and Moldavian Dacia Chişinău in 2006. Nisa Aşgabat won the tournament four times (1999, 2003, 2004 and 2005). Köpetdag Aşgabat and HTTU Aşgabat each won this cup three times, respectively  (1995,1996 and 2001) and (2007, 2008 and 2009). The combined team of the football clubs of Turkmenistan (1997) and the combined team from Ashgabat (2000) won the President’s Cup once each.

Winners

Notes

 

 
President's Cup